Verlag Inspiration Un Limited is a British-German book publishing company, founded in 2007 by Konrad Badenheuer. Its legal seat is London, with a branch in Berlin where all operating activities are concentrated. It produces non-fictional books only, most of them of academic or scientific character. Most of its publications cover political and historical subjects, many of them with reference to Central and Eastern Europe.

Verlag Inspiration Un Limited publishes such authors as Alfred de Zayas, Imbi Paju, Hubertus Hoffmann, Wolfram Euler, and  Martin vom Brocke, among others. Books by Verlag Inspiration Un Limited have been published in German and English.

In May 2011 the German federated state of Hesse purchased 1000 copies of the first book published by Verlag Inspiration Un Limited, 50 Thesen zur Vertreibung (50 Theses on the Expulsion) by Alfred de Zayas (2008). This tax-funded acquisition happened for the purpose of free distribution of the books among institutions of political education in the state of Hesse which followed in July. This decision has been criticized by the state's left wing political opposition which asked the CDU-led government for information in the state parliament (Landtag) of Hesse on 16 September 2011. A spokesman of the far-left Linkspartei called the measure "a nationwide unique scandal".

Books by Verlag Inspiration Un Ltd. (selection of titles with broader media coverage) 
 Alfred de Zayas: 50 Thesen zur Vertreibung [50 Theses on the Expulsion], 52p. (2008)
 Wolfram Euler, Konrad Badenheuer: Sprache und Herkunft der Germanen [Language and Origin of the Germanic speaking Nations], 240p. (2009)
 Andreas Späth, Menno Aden (editors): Die missbrauchte Republik [The Abused Republic], 168p. (2010)
 Alfred de Zayas: 50 Theses on the Expulsion of the Germans from Central and Eastern Europe 1944-1948 [enlarged English speaking edition of 50 Thesen zur Vertreibung (2008)], 72p. (2012)
 Hubertus Hoffmann: True Keeper of the Holy Flame - The Legacy of Pentagon Strategist and Mentor Dr Fritz Kraemer, 384p. (2012)
 Konrad Löw: Adenauer hatte recht [Adenauer was right], 204p. (2014); 2nd edition 2015:  (254 p.).
 Wolfram Euler, Konrad Badenheuer: Sprache und Herkunft der Germanen. Abriss des Frühurgermanischen vor der Ersten Lautverschiebung. [Language and Origin of the Germanic speaking Nations - Draft of Early Proto-Germanic Priot to First Sound Shift], 271p. (2021)
 Das Westgermanische – von der Herausbildung im 3. bis zur Aufgliederung im 7. Jahrhundert – Analyse und Rekonstruktion. <The Proto-West Germanic Language (...)>, 2nd edition, Berlin, 268p. (2022)
 Flexionsklassenwechsel entlehnter Substantive in älteren und konservativen indogermanischen Sprachen, 140p. (2022)

References

External links
  (in German)

Book publishing companies of Germany
Book publishing companies based in London
Publishing companies of Germany
2007 establishments in Germany
Publishing companies established in 2007
Mass media in Berlin